Mosaad Nour (born 23 April 1951—23 April 2011) popularly nicknamed Kastan, is a former Egyptian football player and the historic star for Al-Masry Club.

Career
"Kastan" played for Al-Masry Club between 1972 and 1985 and for the Egyptian National Team between 1974 and 1981 (scoring 5 goals) in 22 international matches.  He made his debut in 1972/73 season of the Egyptian League against Zamalek SC on 25 May 1973, when he scored his first goal with his team in this match which ended (2–2).
Mosaad Nour, is one of the most skilled Egyptian football players and of course the most famous and popular player for Al-Masry throughout its long history.
"Kastan" moved to Al-Masry in 1972 and spent 13 years with the club before he retired in October 1985.
Unfortunately Mosaad Nour could not win any titles with his beloved team Al-Masry although he was so near from capturing the Egypt Cup for two consecutive years in seasons 1982/83 and 1983/84. Meanwhile "Kastan" was so near from winning the Egyptian League in season 1983/84 but he missed the chance.
Mosaad Nour refused all the offers to leave his team, although he had many offers to move to either Al-Ahly or Zamalek SC, and such manner was sufficient to make him the beloved star for Al-Masry's fans throughout the years.

Achievements

Personal 
 Scored 65 goals for Al-Masry in the Egyptian league.

Egyptian national team 
 The fourth place for Egypt national football team in the African Cup of Nations in 1980 (scored one goal)
 Led Egypt to the Olympic Games in 1980.
 Played in the Mediterranean Games 1975 and 1979.

Al-Masry 
 The third place in the Egyptian League for three seasons in 1979/1980, 1980/1981 and 1983/1984.
 The second place in the Egypt Cup for two seasons in 1982/1983 and 1983/1984.

References

External links 
 Alahram weekly article on Mosaad Nour
 Mosaad Nour's history in Al-Masry Club official site

1951 births
2011 deaths
Egyptian footballers
Egypt international footballers
Al Masry SC players
1980 African Cup of Nations players
Sportspeople from Port Said
Association football forwards
Competitors at the 1975 Mediterranean Games
Competitors at the 1979 Mediterranean Games
Mediterranean Games competitors for Egypt